Henryk Jaskuła (22 October 1923 – 14 May 2020) was a yachtsman, sailing captain, and electrical engineer. He was the first Pole to perform a single-handed non-stop circumnavigation of the globe. 
He achieved it on the yacht Dar Przemyśla.

Jaskuła became the third man to circumnavigate the globe non-stop and single-handed on 20 May 1980, the day he returned to Gdynia.

Personal life
He has two daughters: physicist Lidia Morawska and Aleksandra.

Orders 
  Polonia Restituta Officer's Cross

References

Bibliography 
 Henryk Jaskuła - Polish Sailing Encyclopedia (pl.)

Single-handed circumnavigating sailors
Polish sailors
1923 births
2020 deaths